Gnorismoneura exulis is a moth of the family Tortricidae. It is found in Taiwan and Japan.

References

Moths described in 1932
Archipini
Moths of Japan